Kambala Church of England Girls' School is an independent Anglican early learning, primary, and secondary day and boarding school for girls, located in Rose Bay, New South Wales, Australia. Established in 1887, Kambala has a non-selective enrolment policy and currently caters for approximately 1,000 students from early learning to Year 12, including 95 boarders from Year 7 to Year 12. Students come to Kambala from the greater metropolitan area, rural New South Wales and overseas.

The school is affiliated with the Alliance of Girls' Schools Australasia (AGSA), the Junior School Heads Association of Australia (JSHAA), the Association of Heads of Independent Schools of Australia (AHISA), the Australian Boarding Schools' Association (ABSA), and is a founding member of the Association of Heads of Independent Girls' Schools (AHIGS).

History 

Kambala was established in 1887 by Louisa Gurney, the daughter of an English clergyman. Gurney conducted her first classes with twelve girls at a terrace house in Woollahra called 'Fernbank'. In 1891, Augustine Soubeiran, who had assisted in the running of the school and who taught French, became Co-Principal. To accommodate increasing enrolments, the School was moved to a larger property in Bellevue Hill called Kambala, from which the school took its new name.

In 1913, with an enrolment of nearly fifty, the School moved again, to its present site on New South Head Road, Rose Bay. The property was known as "Tivoli", from the original Tivoli Estate, and was previously occupied by Captain William Dumaresq and later by merchant James Robinson Love.  The spacious new building was built in 1841, and the notable architect John Horbury Hunt was commissioned to extend it. Today this building houses classrooms and Kambala's boarders in Years 7 to 9.

In 1926, Kambala became a Church of England Foundation School controlled by an independent council. During Fifi Hawthorne's tenure as Principal, 1933 to 1966, the school grew from 100 students to more than 660, and buildings and facilities expanded accordingly.

Principals

Campus
Kambala is located on a single campus on the rising shore above suburban Rose Bay, overlooking Sydney Harbour. The school is divided into four main areas: 
Hampshire House – the Early Learning Centre (creche)
Massie House for students from Preparation (4 year olds) to Year 2;
Junior School for girls in Years 3 to 6; and
Senior School for girls in Years 7 to 12.

Boarding
Boarding students from Year 7 to Year 9 live in Tivoli, the home of the original Tivoli estate, of which the School was once a part. Frequented by the colonial artist Conrad Martens during the 1840s, extensively renovated by architect John Horbury Hunt in the 1880s, Tivoli features modern dormitory-style living amenities.

Boarders in Years 10 to 12 reside in Fernbank. Opened in 1997, Fernbank provides students with more independent living, social privileges and greater privacy for study.

House system 
The House system was introduced at Kambala in 1928. Each student from Years 3 to 12 is allocated to one of the four houses; Gurney, Hawthorne, Roseby or Wentworth. There are several interhouse competitions throughout the year in which Houses can earn points towards the Angus Cup at the end of the year. Each House is led by two House Captains. Tutor groups are formed according to Houses.

Notable alumnae 

Ex-students of Kambala are known as Old Girls and may elect to join the Kambala Old Girls' Union (KOGU).  Some notable Kambala Old Girls include:
Jessie Strahorn Aspinall – first female junior resident medical officer at Royal Prince Alfred Hospital (1906) (also attended Presbyterian Ladies' College, Sydney)
Claudia Black – actress, best known for her portrayal of Aeryn Sun and Vala Mal Doran in science fiction television series Farscape and Stargate SG-1
Sheila Chisholm – socialite
Michelle Guthrie – former managing director of the Australian Broadcasting Corporation
 Judy Playfair - silver medal-winning swimmer at the 1968 Mexico City Olympics
 Roxy Jacenko- Businesswoman
 Claire Messud - writer

See also 

 List of non-government schools in New South Wales
 List of boarding schools in Australia

References

Further reading 
 Nobbs, A. 1997. Kambala: The First Hundred Years, 1887-1987. Melbourne, Globe Press.
 Lenskyj, H. 2005. A Lot to Learn: Girls, Women and Education in the 20th Century. Toronto, Women's Press.

External links

 Kambala website

Girls' schools in New South Wales
School buildings completed in 1887
Boarding schools in New South Wales
Educational institutions established in 1887
Anglican primary schools in Sydney
Anglican secondary schools in Sydney
Association of Heads of Independent Girls' Schools
Junior School Heads Association of Australia Member Schools
1887 establishments in Australia
Rose Bay, New South Wales
Alliance of Girls' Schools Australasia